Simha may refer to:

Surname
 Abhaya Simha (born 1981), Kannada film director and screenwriter
 Bobby Simha (born 1983), Indian film actor who has appeared in Tamil, Telugu and Malayalam language films
 C. R. Simha (19422014), Indian actor, director and dramatist
 Pratap Simha (born 1976), Indian politician
 Siva Simha Malla (AKA Shiva Simha, before 1583–1619), Malla Dynasty King from Kathmandu
 Vasishta N. Simha (born before 2011), Indian film actor who has appeared in Kannada and Tamil language films

Given name
Simha (also  Simhah, Simcha, and Simchah;  ;) is a Hebrew word that means gladness, or joy, and is often used as a given name.
 Simha of Speyer (13th century), German rabbi and tosafist
 Simha Arom (born 1930), French-Israeli ethnomusicologist
 Simha Babah (190273), Israeli politician
 Simha Bhagavathula (born 1987), Indian playback singer
 Simha Erlich (191583), Israeli politician
 Simha Flapan (191187), Israeli historian and politician
 Simha Tzabari (1913–2004), Israeli politician
 Simha Varman II (before 438–460), ruler from the Pallava Dynasty in what is now Karnataka and coastal Andhra Pradesh

Films
 Keralida Simha, a 1981 Indian Kannada-language film
 Raja Malaya Simha, a 1959 Telugu and Tamil-language film
 Sahasa Simha, a 1982 Indian Kannada-language film
 Simha (film), a 2010 Telugu-language action film
 Simha Gharjane, a 1983 Indian Kannada-language film
 Simha Jodi, a 1980 Indian Kannada-language film
 Simha Swapna, a 1968 Indian Kannada-language film
 Simha Swapnam, a 1989 Telugu-language crime film
 Simhadriya Simha, a 2002 Indian Kannada-language action drama film

Other uses
 Sahasa Simha Comics Series, a detective series in comics format published in English and Kannada
 Simha, a month in the Darian calendar

See also
 

Surnames of Indian origin
Hebrew masculine given names